El Alto (Catamarca) is a village municipality in El Alto Department, Catamarca Province, in northwestern Argentina.

References

Populated places in Catamarca Province